The siege of Oguchi Castle was fought in the year of 1569 when forces of the Shimazu clan besieged the Hishikari clan's castle of Oguchi in Ōsumi Province. The siege was successful and the castle fell to the Shimazu.

References 

Oguchi
1569 in Japan
Shimazu clan
Oguchi
Conflicts in 1569